Cafaminol (brand names Rhinetten, Rhinoptil), also known as methylcoffanolamine, is a vasoconstrictor and anticatarrhal of the methylxanthine family related to caffeine which is used as a nasal decongestant in Germany. It was introduced in 1974 and was still in use as of 2000.

References

Decongestants
Vasoconstrictors
Xanthines